The  1941 German football championship, the 34th edition of the competition, was won by SK Rapid Wien, the club's sole German championship. Rapid, which had previously won twelve Austrian football championships between 1911 and 1938 as well as the 1938 German Cup, won the competition by defeating Schalke 04 4–3 in the final. The final was held on 22 June 1941, the same day Nazi Germany invaded the Soviet Union in Operation Barbarossa.

Overview

FC Schalke 04, having won five of the previous seven finals, being the defending champions and aiming for an unprecedented third consecutive German championship, were the favourites and led the final 3–0 after 57 minutes but Rapid scored four unanswered goals, the last three of them by Franz Binder, to win the championship. It marked the second of three occasions of a club from Vienna (German: Wien) in the final, Rapid becoming the only one to win the competition while Admira Wien had made a losing appearance in the 1939 final and First Vienna FC would do the same in 1942. Austrian clubs had  played in the German league system from 1938, after the Anschluss, until the German surrender in 1945.

Rapid's victory led to a number of conspiracy theories. On Schalke's side it was speculated that Rapid was allowed to win to award a national championship to a club from the Ostmark while, in Austria, the theory developed that Rapid players were punished after the final by being sent to the front line. Both theories were disproven when Rapid, in 2009, commissioned a study into the history of the club during the Nazi era and found no evidence for either. Rapid continues to list both German titles, the 1941 championship and the 1938 cup win, in its honours.

Schalke's Hermann Eppenhoff became the top scorer of the 1941 championship with 15 goals, the highest individual amount for any player in the history of the competition from 1903 to 1963.

The twenty 1940–41 Gauliga champions, two more than in 1940 because of the addition of the Gauliga Elsaß and Gauliga Danzig-Westpreußen, competed in a group stage with the four group winners advancing to the semi-finals. The two semi-final winners then contested the 1941 championship final. The groups were divided into two with four clubs and two with six clubs with the latter, in turn, subdivided into two groups of three teams each and a final of these group winners to determine the overall group champions.

In the following season, the German championship was played with twenty five clubs. From there it gradually expanded further through a combination of territorial expansion of Nazi Germany and the sub-dividing of the Gauligas in later years, reaching a strength of thirty one in its last completed season, 1943–44.

Qualified teams
The teams qualified through the 1940–41 Gauliga season:

 Vorwärts-Rasensport Gleiwitz replaced Germania Königshütte for the finals.

Competition

Group 1

Group 1A
Group 1A was contested by the champions of the Gauligas Danzig-Westpreußen, Pommern and Schlesien:

Group 1B
Group 1B was contested by the champions of the Gauligas Brandenburg, Sachsen and Sudetenland:

Group 1 final

|}

Group 2

Group 2A
Group 2A was contested by the champions of the Gauligas Mitte, Nordmark and Ostpreußen:

Group 2B
Group 2B was contested by the champions of the Gauligas Hessen, Niedersachsen and Westfalen:

Group 2 final

|}

Group 3
Group 3 was contested by the champions of the Gauligas Elsaß, Mittelrhein, Niederrhein and Südwest:

Group 4
Group 4 was contested by the champions of the Gauligas Bayern, Baden, Ostmark and Württemberg:

Semi-finals
Three of the four clubs in the 1941 semi-finals had reached the same stage in the previous season, Rapid Wien, Dresdner SC and FC Schalke 04, while VfL Köln 99 replaced SV Waldhof Mannheim in comparison to 1940:

|align="center" style="background:#ddffdd" colspan=3|8 June 1941

|}

Third place play-off

|align="center" style="background:#ddffdd" colspan=3|22 June 1941

|}

Final

References

Sources
 kicker Allmanach 1990, by kicker, page 164 & 177 – German championship

External links
 German Championship 1940–41 at weltfussball.de 
 German Championship 1941 at RSSSF
 News broadcast from 22 June 1941 with footage of the final  Die Deutsche Wochenschau

1
German
German football championship seasons